The Rocketplane XP was a suborbital spaceplane design that was under development c. 2005 by Rocketplane Kistler.  The vehicle was to be powered by two jet engines and a rocket engine, intended to enable it to reach suborbital space. The XP would have operated from existing spaceports in a manner consistent with established commercial aviation practices. Commercial flights were projected to begin in 2009. Rocketplane Global declared bankruptcy in mid-June 2010. Their assets were auctioned off in 2011.

Design and development

As envisioned, the Rocketplane XP would carry a pilot and five passengers on a flight profile from a runway using jet engines like a conventional aircraft.  It would then climb to about 12 km (40,000 feet).  At this point, a reusable rocket engine would power the XP on a suborbital trajectory reaching altitudes of over  after burnout. The XP was to then reenter Earth's atmosphere and land at the same spaceport under conventional jet power.  The relatively low speeds involved meant that heat shielding was not a major concern.  The XP was expected to operate from the Clinton-Sherman Industrial Airpark near Burns Flat, Oklahoma.

On January 24, 2006 Rocketplane Limited announced a Space Act agreement with NASA Johnson Space Center for the loan of a Rocketdyne RS-88 rocket engine for three years, for use in flight tests of the XP vehicle.

See also
 EADS Astrium Space Tourism Project
 Lynx (spacecraft)
 Dream Chaser
 SpaceShipTwo
 Blue Origin New Shepard

References
Notes

Bibliography

 Belfiore, Michael. "It's a Rocket! It's a Plane! It's...Rocket Plane!"  Popular Science, January 8, 2006.
 "Model XP Specifications."  Rocketplane XP, February 21, 2011.

External links
Rocketplane official website
astronautix.com
Video animation - Rocketplane XP concept

Mixed-power aircraft
Rocket-powered aircraft
Spaceplanes
Abandoned civil aircraft projects of the United States
XP
Low-wing aircraft